Jeanne Wakatsuki Houston (born September 26, 1934) is an American writer. Her writings primarily focus on ethnic identity formation in the United States of America. She is best known for her autobiographical novel Farewell to Manzanar that narrates her personal experiences in World War II internment camps.

Biography
Houston was born in Inglewood, California, on September 26, 1934, attended Long Beach Polytechnic High School for three years and graduated from James Lick High School in San Jose. She was the youngest of four boys and six girls in the Wakatsuki family.

For the first seven years she experienced a normal childhood. She lived in Los Angeles, California until 1942 when President Roosevelt signed Executive Order 9066, causing her and her family to be evacuated. They were forced to leave their home and be taken to Manzanar. They rode in large greyhound buses from Los Angeles to Manzanar, a drive that takes about three hours and forty five minutes today. At the time she was only seven years old. She did not understand what was happening because she had no concept of war. She and her family spent the next three years in the camp, attempting to live a "normal" life behind barbed wire, under the watch of armed guards in searchlight towers. Conditions in the camp were awful and sickness spread throughout the camp quickly. This can be attributed to the compactness of the camp. Nearly 10,000 inmates lived in a 500 acre square, and this caused a lot of illness. Adapting to the climate was also difficult. Winters were very cold, and summers were very hot. The food they were provided was canned military food. It was not uncommon for prisoners to not eat because the food was not the traditional food they were accustomed to. Water in the camp was unclean, and it often caused Dysentery. Despite their efforts, obstacles managed to get in the way: her father's drinking habits and aggressive abuse, having no freedom, and very little space in the cubicles. In her book, Farewell to Manzanar, Jeanne describes the living conditions, "After dinner we were taken to Block 16, a cluster of fifteen barracks that had just been finished a day or so earlier—although finished was hardly a word for it. The shacks were built of pine planking covered with tarpaper. They sat on concrete footings, with about two feet of open space between the floorboards and the ground. Gaps showed between the planks, and as the weeks passed and the green wood dried out, the gaps widened. Knotholes gaped in the uncovered floor.” She goes on to explain the size and layout of the barracks. They were divided into six units that were sixteen long by twenty feet wide, and a singular light bulb hung from the ceiling. They had an oil stove for heat as well as two army blankets each, some mattress covers and steel army cots. However, things eventually improved, and they learned to adapt to their environment. Several years after leaving the camp in 1945, Jeanne went to San Jose State College (now San José State University) where she studied sociology and journalism and participated in the marching band's flag team. She met her husband James D. Houston there, and they married in 1957. Jeanne later decided to tell her story about the time she spent in Manzanar in Farewell to Manzanar, co-authored by her husband, in 1972. Ten years after their marriage, in 1967, Jeanne gave birth to a girl. Six years later she gave birth to twins.

Jeanne has received many awards for her writing as well as her influence, and for being a voice for Japanese American women. A partial list of her awards can be found at https://www.californiamuseum.org/inductee/jeanne-wakatsuki-houston 

Other publications include Don't Cry, It's Only Thunder (1984) with Paul G. Hensler as co-author, and Beyond Manzanar and Other Views of Asian-American Womanhood (1985).

Farewell to Manzanar 

In her book Farewell to Manzanar (1973), Houston writes about her family's experiences at Manzanar, an internment camp in California's Owens Valley where Japanese Americans were imprisoned during World War II. Jeanne was inspired to write the book when her nephew, who was born in Manzanar, began to learn about it in college and wanted to know more about the place he was born. Her husband, James, co-authored the book. He believed it was not just a book for their family but for the whole world. He would be proven correct, as today it has sold over one million copies. The novel was adapted into a television movie in 1976, starring Nobu McCarthy, who portrayed both Houston as well as her mother in the film.

Distribution
In an effort to educate Californians about the experiences of Japanese Americans who were imprisoned during World War II, the book and movie were distributed in 2002 as part of a kit to approximately 8,500 public elementary and secondary schools and 1,500 public libraries in California. The kit also included study guides tailored to the book, and a video teaching guide. Today, Farewell to Manzanar has sold over one million copies.

See also 

List of Asian American writers

References
 Wakatsuki Houston, Jeanne. Academic Interview. Nov. 2022

Critical studies 
"National and Ethnic Affiliation in Internment Autobiographies of Childhood by Jeanne Wakatsuki Houston and George Takei" By: Davis, Rocío G.; Amerikastudien/American Studies, 2006; 51 (3): 355-68. (journal article)
"'But Isn't This the Land of the Free?': Resistance and Discovery in Student Responses to Farewell to Manzanar" By: Chappell, Virginia A.. pp. 172–88 IN: Severino, Carol (ed. and introd.); Guerra, Juan C. (ed. and introd.); Butler, Johnnella E. (ed. and introd.); Writing in Multicultural Settings. New York, NY: Modern Language Association of America; 1997. xi, 370 pp. (book article)
"The Politics of Possession: The Negotiation of Identity in American in Disguise, Homebase, and Farewell to Manzanar" By: Sakurai, Patricia A.. pp. 157–70 IN: Okihiro, Gary Y. (ed. & introd.); Alquizola, Marilyn (ed.); Rony, Dorothy Fujita (ed.); Wong, K. Scott (ed.); Privileging Positions: The Sites of Asian American Studies. Pullman: Washington State UP; 1995. xiii, 448 pp. (book article)
"The Politics of Possession: Negotiating Identities in American in Disguise, Homebase, and Farewell to Manzanar" By: Sakurai, Patricia A.; Hitting Critical Mass: A Journal of Asian American Cultural Criticism, 1993 Fall; 1 (1): 39-56. (journal article)

External links 
 Jeanne Wakatsuki Houston, Notable Asian Americans, PDF

1934 births
Living people
20th-century American memoirists
Japanese-American internees
San Jose State University alumni
People from Inglewood, California
American writers of Japanese descent
20th-century American women writers
American autobiographers
American women memoirists
21st-century American women
American women writers of Asian descent